The 1997 Exxon World Sports Car Championship and Supreme GT Series seasons were the 27th season of the IMSA GT Championship.  It consisted of open-cockpit prototypes referred to as World Sports Car (WSC) and Grand Tourer-style racing cars divided into GTS-1, GTS-2, and GTS-3 classes.

It began February 1, 1997, and ended October 26, 1997, after eleven rounds. 1997 would mark the final year in IMSA GT for the 24 Hours of Daytona and the Six Hours of Watkins Glen. In 1998, the SCCA's revived United States Road Racing Championship would acquire the events.

Schedule
Most races on the schedule ran with the GTS and WSC classes running separate races, sometimes with different lengths.  Races marked with Both had both classes on track at the same time for the whole race.

Season results

Teams Championship
Points are awarded to the finishers in the following order:
 25-21-19-17-15-14-13-12-11-10-...
Exception however for the 12 Hours of Sebring, which awarded in the following order:
 30-26-24-22-20-19-18-17-16-15-...
And the 24 Hours of Daytona, which is awarded in the following order:
 33-29-27-25-23-22-21-20-19-18-...

Teams only score the points of their highest finishing entry in each race.

WSC Standings

External links
 World Sports Racing Prototypes - 1998 IMSA GT Championship results

IMSA GT Championship seasons
IMSA GT